Pierre Gagnaire (born 9 April 1950 in Apinac, Loire) is a French chef, and the head chef and owner of the eponymous Pierre Gagnaire restaurant at 6 rue Balzac in Paris (in the 8th arrondissement). Gagnaire is an iconoclastic chef at the forefront of the fusion cuisine movement. Beginning his career in St. Etienne where he won three Michelin Stars, Gagnaire tore at the conventions of classic French cooking by introducing jarring juxtapositions of flavours, tastes, textures, and ingredients.
On his website, Gagnaire gives his mission statement as the wish to run a restaurant which is 'facing tomorrow but respectful of yesterday' ("tourné vers demain mais soucieux d'hier").

In Europe
The restaurant, Pierre Gagnaire, specializes in modern French cuisine and has garnered three Michelin stars. Gagnaire is also head chef of Sketch in London. In 2005, both restaurants were ranked in the S.Pellegrino World's 50 Best Restaurants by industry magazine Restaurant, with Pierre Gagnaire ranking third for three consecutive years (2006, 2007, and 2008).

In the United States
In December 2009, Gagnaire made his United States debut with Twist, a new restaurant at the Mandarin Oriental in Las Vegas, which has since received a Forbes Five-Star Award.

Media appearances
Pierre Gagnaire has made appearances on Fuji TV's Iron Chef.  He represented France in the 1995 Iron Chef World Cup in Tokyo, with the other chefs chosen being Italy's Gianfranco Vissani and Hong Kong's Xu Cheng as well as Iron Chef Japanese Rokusaburo Michiba representing Japan. He also appeared in the "France Battle Special" at Château de Brissac, where he battled Iron Chef French Hiroyuki Sakai.

Awards
In 2015, Gagnaire won a Best Chef in the World award.

Restaurants
 Paris, Pierre Gagnaire, 1996–
 Paris, Gaya rive gauche par Pierre Gagnaire, 2005–
 Berlin, Les Solistes by Pierre Gagnaire, 2013–2016 (closed)
 Bordeaux, La Grande Maison
 Châtelaillon, Gaya Cuisine De Bords de Mer
 Courchevel, Piero TT, 2007–
 Danang, La Maison 1888
 Dubai, Restaurant CHOIX Pâtisserie TT Restaurant par Pierre Gagnaire, 2008–
 Gordes, Peir 2015-
 Hong Kong, Pierre, 2006–2020
 Las Vegas, Twist, 2009–
 London, Sketch, 2002–
 Moscow, Les Menus par Pierre Gagnaire, (closed)
 Riyadh, Acacia by Pierre Gagnaire, (closed)
 Seoul, Pierre Gagnaire à Séoul, 2008–
 Saint-Tropez, Colette, (closed)
 Shanghai, Le Comptoir de Pierre Gagnaire, 2017–
 Tokyo, http://www.pierre-gagnaire.com/ Pierre Gagnaire - Tokyo], 2005–
 Barrière Hotels group (Paris, Enghien les Bains, Courchevel, Toulouse, Cannes, La Baule) Fouquet's

References

External links
 Official website

1950 births
Living people
People from Loire (department)
French chefs
Molecular gastronomy
Head chefs of Michelin starred restaurants